William Alexander Leidesdorff, Jr. (October 23, 1810 – May 18, 1848) was one of the earliest biracial-black U.S. citizens in California and one of the founders of the city that became San Francisco. A highly successful, enterprising businessman, he was a West Indian immigrant of African Cuban, possibly Carib, Danish/Swedish and Jewish ancestry. Leidesdorff became a United States citizen in New Orleans in 1834. He migrated to Alta California in 1841, then under Mexican rule, settling in Yerba Buena (now San Francisco), a village of about 30 Mexican and European families.

He served as US Vice Consul to Mexico at the Port of San Francisco beginning in 1845. Leidesdorff was President of the San Francisco school board and also elected as City Treasurer. Shortly before Leidesdorff's death, vast amounts of gold were officially reported on his Rancho Rio De los Americanos. By the time his estate was auctioned off in 1856, it was worth more than $1,445,000, not including vast quantities of gold mined upon his land.

International Leidesdorff Bicentennial Celebrations featured the "Golden Legacy of William Alexander Leidesdorff, Jr." On October 22, 2011 on his native isle of Saint Croix, U.S. Virgin Islands, a special event was to highlight the season of celebrations.

Early life 
Born in Christiansted in Saint Croix when the Virgin Islands were under Danish rule (Danish West Indies), William Leidesdorff, Jr. was the oldest son of four children of Danish sugar plantation manager Wilhelm Alexander Leidesdorff (who used Alexander Leidesdorff as his name) and his common-law wife Anna Marie Sparks, reportedly of African and Spanish descent. Wilhelm Leidesdorff Sr. was reportedly of Jewish descent from the community of Altona, Hamburg. It was part of the Danish Schleswig-Holstein, then across the river from but now part of today's port of Hamburg, Germany. He migrated to North America and later the Caribbean to further his career as a merchant. Leidesdorff and Anna Marie lived in New Orleans under Spanish rule before the Louisiana Purchase, and he worked as a sugar factor.

Leidesdorff, Jr.'s mother Anna Marie Sparks, was described in one account as a Carib Indian woman; she was believed also to have had African and European ancestry. Her race was noted in a census report. Many people observed that what were called "Carib" people had skin of various hues that likely reflected mixed ancestry, ranging from dark brown to lighter shades of brown, resulting in a Virgin Islands Creole, to which she may have belonged. Other sources said the mother Marie Anne Spark (as she was also known) was a mixed-race woman of African and Spanish heritage, thought to have been born in Cuba. In census records, Marie Anne Spark was classified as a free Carib Indian, but few Carib survived into the late 18th century, according to Gary Palgon's biography of Leidesdorff. Other sources document tens of thousands of Caribs, most of mixed heritage, living in the Windwards and Trinidad at the time of Leidesdorff's birth. Together the accounts describe Spark as a light-skinned woman of mixed-race ancestry, yet classified as black by the 1850s California Court System, where blacks were restricted from testifying in court.
According to Sue Bailey Thurman, "With the name of William Alexander Leidesdorff, we begin the documentary history of pioneers of Negro origin in California."

Today, William Alexander Leidesdorff, Jr. is recognized as the "African Founding Father of California", as noted by the California State Legislature.  2011 is the United Nations International Year for People of African Descent.

As an infant, William Leidesdorff, Jr. was baptized as a Lutheran, as all the Leidesdorff children were, the adopted faith which his father and many other people of Jewish ancestry in Europe assumed to avoid conflict.  In 1837 Leidesdorff, Sr. officially "adopted" all four of his own children from Anne Marie Sparks to give them legal standing by Danish Law.

Career 
Afterward, he migrated to New Orleans, where he operated as a master of shipping vessels after he was naturalized as a United States citizen.  He held posts with firms associated with his father or perhaps his mentors. Ship manifest documents show Leidesdorff's working as Ship Captain and/or Master, 1834–1840, out of the Port of New Orleans.  William Alexander Leidesdorff, Jr. was thought the last black ship captain in Louisiana after strict enforcement of the Negro Seamen Acts began at the Port of New Orleans.

Leidesdorff traveled to New York to become the Master of the schooner Julia Ann that sailed from New York to Yerba Buena (later San Francisco) in Alta California, then part of Mexico, in 1841.  His route was via Panama, St. Croix, Brazil, Chile, the Sandwich Islands (Hawaii), Sitka (Alaska), and on to California following the Pacific Ocean currents during the "Age of Sail".

In San Francisco 

On arriving at Yerba Buena, Leidesdorff, Jr. began to re-build his businesses. The village cove then only had thirty European-Mexican families, so it did not take long for the ambitious man to make an impact. He built the City Hotel, the first hotel in San Francisco, and the first commercial shipping warehouse, the latter on what became Leidesdorff Street off the Embarcadero.

During this period, Mexico encouraged leading Americans to settle in its territory by granting large land grants; in exchange the government required Americans to convert to Catholicism, the state religion; learn to speak Spanish; and accept Mexican citizenship. He went on to establish extensive commercial relations throughout Hawaii, Alaska and Mexican California.

During the eight years of his residence, Leidesdorff served as one of six aldermen or town councilors of the Ayuntamiento. After the United States took over California following the Mexican–American War, he was one of three members on the first San Francisco school board, which organized the first public school in the city; later he was elected City Treasurer. His house was one of the largest, and he donated land for the first public school.

In 1845, during the President James Polk administration, Leidesdorff accepted the request from United States Consul Thomas O. Larkin to serve as the US Vice Consul to Mexico at the Port of San Francisco, a measure of his political standing in region. Larkin was the first and last U.S. consul appointed to serve in California. Before the American flag was raised over San Francisco (July 1846), Leidesdorff had the U.S. Declaration of Independence read for the first time in California on the veranda at his home in celebration of Independence Day.

Leidesdorff, Jr. achieved a high reputation for integrity and enterprise; he is said to have been "liberal, hospitable, cordial, confiding even to a fault." Leidesdorff became one of the wealthiest man in California. The value of his property near Sacramento began to rise dramatically just before his death, when gold was discovered along the American River just above his Leidesdorff Ranch, in the Gold Mining District of California.

In March 1848, the California Star reported the total non-Native population of San Francisco as only 812: 575 males, 177 females and 60 children. In May 1848, the vast majority of men departed for the American River gold fields in hopes of striking it rich. Other towns were nearly emptied in the frenzy of the Gold Rush.

Personal life 
Leidesdorff never married. According to the explorer John C. Fremont, he lived with a Russian woman while maintaining diplomatic relationships with the Russian community in Sitka, Alaska.

William Alexander Leidesdorff, Jr. died of typhoid fever on May 18, 1848.  On the day of his burial, the town was in mourning, flags were at half-mast, business was suspended, and the schools were closed. His remains were interred near the front entrance of Mission Dolores on the same day, May 18, 1848.

Legacy and honors 
 Leidesdorff Street in San Francisco, California and Leidesdorff Street in Folsom, California are named for him.
  of U.S. Route 50 was dedicated the William Alexander Leidesdorff, Jr. Memorial Highway along the boundary of "Historic Leidesdorff Ranch", his  cattle and wheat ranch along the southern banks of the American River Parkway, Sacramento County.
 25th Anniversary of the Federal Holiday for Dr. Martin Luther King Jr. at the CORE New York City, New York Gala honoring the Leidesdorff Legacy.
 Leidesdorff Exhibit, Mission Delores Basilica, San Francisco, California, May 1–31, 2010
 Leidesdorff Bicentennial Celebration – "Golden Legacy of William Alexander Leidesdorff, Jr.," October 23, 2010, St. Croix, U.S. Virgin Islands.

Leidesdorff estate and controversy 
The California pioneer died intestate, with no living relatives in California or the United States.  In 1848 his estate was assumed devalued and in debt. The public discovery of gold in the American River valley and upon his extensive land holdings increased the actual value of his estate dramatically. His waterfront property in today's financial district of San Francisco would be valuable today. A complete inventory of his estate has yet to be quantified.  The court appointed temporary administrators of his estate because there were no probate laws in California at that time.  By 1854, when the California State Legislature considered escheat to take control of the property, Leidesdorff's estate was worth well over one million dollars and multiple of millions of dollars in gold was mined off his land.  When the Leidesdorff-Folsom partitioned estate was auctioned off in 1856, the property brought more than $1,445,000.

Settlement of the estate was complicated by the actions of Joseph Folsom.  As Customs Collector and Harbor Master for San Francisco in 1848, he had become familiar with Leidesdorff's business dealings with the U.S. Army.

In 1849, Folsom took leave from the U.S. Army and located Leidesdorff's mother and some of his siblings in the West Indies. Folsom signed a note to purchase from Anna Spark title to her son's estate for $75,000, title which included all of Leidesdorff's real estate holdings in San Francisco as well as the  Rancho Rio de los Americanos near Sacramento.  He paid her a deposit, with the promise of two more installment payments.

By the time Folsom returned to San Francisco, land prices were rising.  The government challenged his purchase of Leidesdorff's title, as Anna Spark legally had no claim to it. A California State government "claim was brought because under old Mexican law that foreigners could not inherit property.  The dispute was brought to the courts, where legal entanglements over the conflicts of Mexican, American and Danish laws kept it for over ten years."  The uncertainty of new probate laws, combined with the fact that William Leidesdorff, though he had held federal offices, held dual Mexican and U.S. citizenship, further complicated the property issues.

Leidesdorff's St. Croix relatives, mother and siblings, challenged title through Danish officials because of Folsom's false evaluation of the estate. Both the US and Mexican national governments had interest in the large estate. The high value and reach of the Leidesdorff estate made Folsom's "purchase" extremely controversial. In 1854, Governor Bigler, recommended the escheat of the estate, then worth a million and a half, to the state legislature, and suggested that proceedings be commenced for its recovery from Folsom. The courts refused to admit the title of the West Indian mixed-race relatives because there may have been "other heirs, who had never conveyed away their rights in the estate", from Europe.  These "other heirs" from Leidesdorff's father's family lived in Europe at Altona and Copenhagen, and in the Caribbean Islands.

Ultimately the following happened:
(1) The claims of Leidesdorff's West Indian relatives were thrown out of court; their evidence of relationship was rejected. As they were not American citizens, they were not considered to have standing.
(2) No recognized Danish family or individual of the name of Leidesdorff appeared to claim the estate of William Leidesdorff of San Francisco.  Other Danish members of the family lived on St. Croix for some time after the American's death.
(3) The statute of limitations covered and protected every title obtained from Joseph L. Folsom and others who later acquired possession.

References

Sources 
 California Reports, 1854
 "William Leidesdorf", Jewish Encyclopedia, 1906
 Journal of the Senate of California, 1854: Soule, Annals of San Francisco Hittell, History of California, vols. ii and iv
 California State Legislature, ACR 131 (Cox), 2004
 A. J. V. Sweasy, Early Days and Men of California''

19th-century Danish people
Danish Jews
Danish sailors
1810 births
1848 deaths
People from Saint Croix, U.S. Virgin Islands
People from the Danish West Indies
Danish emigrants to the United States
African-American diplomats
American diplomats
American people of Danish-Jewish descent
Jewish American people in California politics
California local politicians
City and town treasurers in the United States
School board members in California
California city council members
Ranchers from California
African-American history in San Francisco
History of San Francisco
19th-century American politicians
African Americans in California